Tihuatlán is a city and its surrounding municipality located in the north of the Mexican state of Veracruz, about 316 km from state capital Xalapa. The municipality has a surface of 828.29 km². The name comes from the Nahuatl language  cihua-tlan, which means "place of women".

Geographic limits
Tihuatlán  is delimited to the north by the municipalities of Temapache and Tuxpan, to the east by Papantla, Poza Rica and Cazones de Herrera, to the south by Coatzintla, and to the south-west by the state of Puebla. It is watered by the rivers Cazones and Tontepec, which end in the Gulf of Mexico.

Agriculture
It primarily produces maize, beans, green chile and oranges.

Celebrations

In Tihuatlán, in October takes place the celebration in honor of Saint Francis of Assisi, Patron of the town, and in December takes place the celebration in honor to the Virgin of Guadalupe.

Transportation
El Tajín National Airport is located in Tihuatlán.

Weather
The weather in Tihuatlán is warm and wet all year with rains in summer and autumn.

References

External links 

  Municipal Official webpage
  Municipal Official Information

Municipalities of Veracruz